is a Japanese video game designer, director, and producer. He is a senior officer of Nintendo EPD and executive at Nintendo.

Career
Upon graduating the Design Department of Osaka University of Arts, he joined Nintendo in April 1984 and became a co-designer of some of the most critically acclaimed Nintendo series, including Mario and The Legend of Zelda. Tezuka is fond of fantasy novels such as J. R. R. Tolkien's The Lord of the Rings, and wrote the story and script for The Legend of Zelda and Zelda II: The Adventure of Link. Tezuka co-designed Yoshi, who debuted in Super Mario World after Shigeru Miyamoto had originally wanted Mario to ride a dinosaur since Super Mario Bros. 3.

Games

References

External links 

1960 births
Japanese video game designers
Japanese video game directors
Japanese video game producers
Living people
Mythopoeic writers
Nintendo people
Osaka University of Arts alumni
People from Osaka